Nelson City was a provincial electoral district in the Canadian province of British Columbia.  It first appeared on the hustings in the 1903 election and lasted until 1912, after which the area of Nelson, B.C. was represented by the Nelson riding.  For other current and historical electoral districts in the Kootenay region, please see Kootenay (electoral districts).

Demographics

Electoral history 
Note:  Winners in each election are in bold.

|Conservative
|John Houston
|align="right"|424
|align="right"|54.29%
|align="right"|
|align="right"|unknown

|Liberal
|Sidney Stockton Taylor
|align="right"|357
|align="right"|45.71%
|align="right"|
|align="right"|unknown
|- bgcolor="white"
!align="right" colspan=3|Total valid votes
!align="right"|781
!align="right"|100.00%
!align="right"|
|- bgcolor="white"
!align="right" colspan=3|Total rejected ballots
!align="right"|
!align="right"|
!align="right"|
|- bgcolor="white"
!align="right" colspan=3|Turnout
!align="right"|%
!align="right"|
!align="right"|
|}

|Liberal
|George Arthur Benjamin Hall
|align="right"|314
|align="right"|43.67%
|align="right"|
|align="right"|unknown

|Conservative
|John Andrew Kirkpatrick
|align="right"|309
|align="right"|42.98%
|align="right"|
|align="right"|unknown

|- bgcolor="white"
!align="right" colspan=3|Total valid votes
!align="right"|719
!align="right"|100.00%
!align="right"|
|- bgcolor="white"
!align="right" colspan=3|Total rejected ballots
!align="right"|
!align="right"|
!align="right"|
|- bgcolor="white"
!align="right" colspan=3|Turnout
!align="right"|%
!align="right"|
!align="right"|
|}

|Liberal
|Albert Edward Crease
|align="right"|323
|align="right"|31.18%
|align="right"|
|align="right"|unknown

|Conservative
|Harry Wright
|align="right"|565
|align="right"|54.54%
|align="right"|
|align="right"|unknown
|- bgcolor="white"
!align="right" colspan=3|Total valid votes
!align="right"|1,036
!align="right"|100.00%
!align="right"|
|- bgcolor="white"
!align="right" colspan=3|Total rejected ballots
!align="right"|
!align="right"|
!align="right"|
|- bgcolor="white"
!align="right" colspan=3|Turnout
!align="right"|%
!align="right"|
!align="right"|
|}

|Conservative
|William Ross MacLean
|align="right"|527
|align="right"|59.08%

|- bgcolor="white"
!align="right" colspan=3|Total valid votes
!align="right"|892
!align="right"|100.00%

The Nelson City riding made its last appearance in the 1912 election.  Following redistribution, the new riding covering this area in the 1916 election was Nelson.

Sources 
Elections BC Historical Returns

Former provincial electoral districts of British Columbia